Jarbidge Lake is a glacial tarn in the Jarbidge Mountains of Elko County, Nevada, United States. It is within the Jarbidge Wilderness, which is administered by the Jarbidge Ranger District of the Humboldt-Toiyabe National Forest.  The lake is near the southern terminus of the Jarbidge River Trail where it meets the West Marys River Trail and Emerald Lake Trail, and is just below Emerald Lake Pass. Jarbidge Lake is the principal source of the Jarbidge River.

"Jarbidge" is a name derived from the Shoshone language meaning "devil".

References 

Lakes of Elko County, Nevada
Lakes of Nevada